Villain and Widow (lit. "Villain on the Second Floor") is a 2010 South Korean film written and directed by Son Jae-gon about a depressed widower who rents out a room to a suspicious man who claims to be a novelist.

Plot
Yeon-joo, a depressed widow, lives with her bad-tempered daughter, Seong-ah, who's an ex-child model but is now being bullied in school. Things become worse when she starts to experience financial problems. Now deep in debt, Yeon-joo decides to rent out a room in her house to a mysterious man named Chang-in who introduces himself as a novelist. Unbeknownst to her, Chang-in is a thief who's trying to get his hands on a set of Ming Dynasty tea utensils that her deceased husband stole.

Cast
 Kim Hye-soo as Yeon-joo
 Han Suk-kyu as Chang-in
 Ji Woo as Ham Seong-ah
 Kim Ki-cheon as Seong-sik
 Lee Yong-nyeo as Next door neighbor
 Lee Jang-woo as Constable Oh 
 Oh Jae-gyun as Section chief Song
 Um Ki-joon as Representative Ha
 Shin Dongho as Hyun-chul
 Park Won-sang as Ham Ki-soo
 Park Hyuk-kwon as Manager Jo
 Yoon Hee-seok as Doctor Nam
 Bae Jang-soo as Owner of real estate agency

Production
In 2009, the film was given the Lotte Award and received  in funding at the Asian Project Market (then-called Pusan Promotion Plan) of the 14th Busan International Film Festival.

Reception
Russell Edwards of Variety called it "amusing if overlong." James Mudge of Beyond Hollywood described it as "a breath of fresh air" that "[refuses] to comply with the usual tired genre clichés." Pierce Conran of Modern Korean Cinema wrote that it "transcends genre." Kyu Hyun Kim of Koreanfilm.org wrote that it is "a superbly intelligent and supremely witty piece of entertainment."

Kim Hye-soo received Best Actress nominations at the 48th Grand Bell Awards and the 32nd Blue Dragon Film Awards in 2011. She also won a Popular Star Award at the latter.

Awards and nominations

References

External links
  
 
 
 

2010 films
2010s Korean-language films
Sidus Pictures films
South Korean comedy films
South Korean mystery films
2010s South Korean films